He's a Bully, Charlie Brown is the 44th prime-time animated television special based on the comic strip Peanuts by Charles M. Schulz. It was originally aired on the ABC network on November 20, 2006. It is the third most recent Peanuts television special and is primarily based on a story from the Peanuts comic strips originally appearing in April 1995. He's a Bully, Charlie Brown was an idea Schulz had pitched, and worked on before his death on February 12, 2000. Schulz's working title for the special was It's Only Marbles, Charlie Brown. Animation was produced by Toon-Us-In.

It is the last special to be produced by and feature Bill Melendez as the voice of Snoopy and Woodstock, as he died on September 2, 2008. It was also the last new special to air on ABC as the next special Happiness Is a Warm Blanket, Charlie Brown aired on Fox. This is also the last Peanuts special from the 2000s, and the last special to be in standard definition.

Plot
As summer approaches, Charlie Brown is preparing to go off to summer camp with Snoopy, Linus, Marcie, and other children. Peppermint Patty, however, must attend summer school due to her poor grades, much to her dismay. Before the trip, Rerun van Pelt finds a jar of marbles his grandfather Felix once owned, and decides to bring the marbles to camp in the hopes of learning how to play. Once they arrive at camp, the kids meet Joe Agate, who begins bullying them.

On his way to the camp's trading post to buy a lollipop, Rerun sees Joe defeat another boy in a game of marbles. Rerun asks Joe if he can teach him how to play, and Joe agrees on the false pretense of teaching him the game. Joe easily defeats Rerun, and proceeds to take away of all his marbles. Heartbroken, Rerun explains to Charlie Brown what has happened. Disgusted, Charlie Brown vows to win back the marbles and isolates himself in the boathouse, where Snoopy (as alter ego Joe Cool) instructs him on the game until he becomes skilled enough to defeat Joe.

Meanwhile, back home, Peppermint Patty suspects that Charlie Brown has become Marcie's love interest. Her temper flares when Marcie begins teasing her over the telephone. Patty, overcome with jealousy, hatches a plan to leave town and interrupt Marcie's supposed romance, but when she arrives at camp she learns that nobody has seen Charlie Brown in days.

On the last day of camp, Charlie Brown has Snoopy summon the other campers to the trading post. There, Charlie Brown challenges Joe, who is angered when Charlie Brown reveals his unfair ways of playing to the others. Everyone watches the two compete; Initially, Joe wins and takes all of Charlie Brown's marbles, but Snoopy provides two spares. Joe reluctantly starts the game over and takes out one marble, but then attempts a trick shot and misses. Charlie Brown shoots and wins the last marble, along with Joe's shooter. Charlie Brown makes another bet; if Joe wants his shooter back, they should play for all the marbles. Joe is unsure why he would agree to such a lopsided deal, because Charlie Brown only has three marbles and Joe has hundreds. Charlie Brown says that if he misses a single shot, no matter how much he has won, Joe gets all the marbles. Joe, feeling unbeatable at that bet, agrees. Ultimately, Charlie Brown wins all the marbles in a single turn, much to Joe's dismay. Charlie Brown says he does not want Joe's marbles and offers them back in exchange for the marbles Joe took from Rerun; Joe concedes all of the marbles and leaves. When the kids return home, Charlie Brown is delighted by Lucy's shock and disbelief at his victory.

At home, Patty asks Marcie what Marcie did with Charlie Brown at camp while she was away. Marcie explains that there was the Moonlight Walk, before she says, "It wasn't really a walk. We just got started before Charles walked into a tree."

During the end credits, Snoopy and some birds sleep on tents, while Woodstock roasts a marshmallow and sings.

Voice cast
 Spencer Robert Scott as Charlie Brown
 Stephanie Patton as Lucy van Pelt
 Taylor Lautner as Joe Agate, the bully
 Rory Thost as Peppermint Patty
 Jessica Gordon as Marcie
 Jimmy Bennett as Rerun van Pelt
 Benjamin Bryan as Linus van Pelt
 Bill Melendez as Snoopy, Woodstock
 Katie Fischer/Sierra Marcoux as Sally Brown
 Jolean Wejbe as Violet
 Paul Butcher, Jr. as Roy
Patty, Frieda, Schroeder, and Pig-Pen also appear in this special, but do not speak.

Production notes
The storyline He's a Bully, Charlie Brown was an amalgamation of several different series of Peanuts strips; the "Joe Agate" storyline originally appeared in the strip in 1995, and the story involving Peppermint Patty sneaking away from summer school to see Charlie Brown at camp was an adaptation of a series of strips from 1989.

This was the first and only Peanuts special to use CGI for one sequence, when the school bus pulled up to the camp.

Music score
As with It's Christmastime Again, Charlie Brown and You're in the Super Bowl, Charlie Brown, jazz pianist David Benoit performed and arranged the music score consisting of variations of songs originally performed by jazz pianist Vince Guaraldi. Guaraldi composed music scores for the first 16 Peanuts television specials and one feature film (A Boy Named Charlie Brown) before his untimely death in February 1976.

All songs written by Vince Guaraldi, except where noted.

"Linus and Lucy"
"Air Music" (aka "Surfin' Snoopy")
"Happiness Is"
"Peppermint Patty"
"Linus and Lucy" (reprise)
"The Masked Marvel"
"Oh, Good Grief" (Vince Guaraldi, Lee Mendelson)
"The Masked Marvel" (reprise)
"Happiness Is" (reprise)
"You're in Love, Charlie Brown"
"Pebble Beach"
"The Masked Marvel" (second reprise)
Medley: "The Masked Marvel"/"Linus and Lucy"
"Happiness Is" (second reprise)
"Linus and Lucy" (second reprise)
"Oh, Good Grief" (reprise) (Vince Guaraldi, Lee Mendelson)
"Linus and Lucy" (third reprise, end credits)

Reception
This special aired on ABC on November 20, 2006, following a repeat broadcast of 1973's A Charlie Brown Thanksgiving.The show won their time slot with 9.4 million viewers, beating out a Madonna special on NBC.

Home media
The special released on DVD as a bonus special in the remastered deluxe edition of You're Not Elected, Charlie Brown on October 7, 2008 by Warner Home Video. On October 6, 2015, Warner Home Video released the special on its own DVD with It Was a Short Summer, Charlie Brown and an episode from The Charlie Brown and Snoopy Show as bonus specials. The special began streaming on September 9, 2022 on Apple TV+ as part of The Peanuts Classics Collection.

References

External links
 He's a Bully, Charlie Brown being shown at the Schulz Museum on 28 October 2006
 

Summer camps in television
Peanuts television specials
Television shows directed by Bill Melendez
American Broadcasting Company television specials
2000s American television specials
2000s animated television specials
2006 television specials
Bullying in fiction